The Expansion of the A-League Men is the ongoing process of establishing new clubs in the A-League Men. The A-League Men was established to replace the NSL as the top soccer division in the Australian league system and is the only fully professional league in the country. It was founded in 2004 with eight teams commencing competition in 2005 and has since expanded into new markets across Australia and New Zealand. The league is currently contested by 12 teams, although a total of 15 have competed at some stage in its short history.

In February 2018, officials announced that the league would expand to 12 teams for the 2019–20 season. After the board of Football Federation Australia was replaced at an annual general meeting in November 2018, the organisation announced that Western United FC would join the A-League Men in the 2019–20 season and Macarthur FC would join in 2020–21.

There is also a long term prospect of teams being added to the A-League Men from a second division that involves Promotion and relegation. Football Australia and the Association of Australian Football Clubs, a group of clubs that currently exist in the state & regional "Member Federations" have been working to implement a second division team with an eventual goal that a football pyramid that would see clubs move between the A-League Men & the second tier, and between the second tier & state leagues.

Initial teams

Football Federation Australia (FFA) exercised caution when forming the A-League Men in early 2004; in terms of selecting who was to be part of the new league. FFA decided upon a 'one city – one team' principle in order to protect the initial development of the foundation clubs.

The initial eight teams selected were Adelaide United FC, Brisbane Roar FC (formerly Queensland Roar FC), Central Coast Mariners FC, Melbourne Victory FC, Newcastle Jets FC, Perth Glory FC, Sydney FC and New Zealand Knights FC. Of these 8 clubs, only the New Zealand Knights have failed to survive, folding after the 2006–07 season.

Expansion

Before the introduction of the A-League, FFA chairman Frank Lowy speculated that he hoped to expand the league into other cities, citing Adelaide, Canberra, Hobart, Wollongong, Coffs Harbour, Geelong, 
Bendigo, Cairns, Ballarat, Albury-Wodonga, Launceston, Christchurch, Auckland, Sunshine Coast and possibly Darwin.

Wellington (2007)

In late October 2006, as a result of low crowd attendance at North Harbour Stadium in Auckland and continual poor on-field performances, rumours began to circulate that the FFA was considering revoking the A-League licence of the only New Zealand based A-League club, New Zealand Knights FC, and granting it to a new club that would enter the competition in the 2007–08 season. The FFA had continued to express angst at low attendance numbers, poor on-field performance and the lack of domestically developed players. On 14 December, the FFA announced that it had revoked the competition licence held by the Knights' owners, and on 19 March 2007 after several delays, Wellington Phoenix was selected as the successor to the New Zealand Knights.

Gold Coast and Townsville (2009)

In 2009, the league expanded in Gold Coast with the new club Gold Coast United FC and in Townsville with the club North Queensland Fury FC. Expansion into these new regions was seen as critical to the success of the 2022 Australian FIFA World Cup bid. In 2011, after the failed bid, North Queensland Fury was removed from the league due to financial instability. In 2012 Fury re-formed to participate in the National Premier League Queensland. In 2012 the FFA revoked Clive Palmer's Gold Coast United A-League licence.

Melbourne Heart/City (2010)

After Melbourne Victory FC announced they would not be playing at the new Melbourne Rectangular Stadium unless it had a capacity of at least 30,000, the government suggested a second Melbourne team would play there. A consortium of investors made it clear that an operating budget of 5 to 6 million dollars per annum was feasible and a letter of interest from the soccer club had been sent to the FFA. In June 2008, it was revealed that three separate consortiums were bidding for second Melbourne franchise licence. In September 2008, a bid led by Victorian businessman Peter Sidwell and operating under the working title Melbourne Heart Syndicate received exclusive negotiating rights an A-League licence. Sidwell's group was awarded the licence to join the 2010–11 season on 12 June 2009. The new club was named Melbourne Heart FC, though prior to the 2014–15 season it was acquired by the City Football Group and has since been known as Melbourne City FC.

Sydney Rovers (2010)

The club was planned to be the 12th official franchise in the A-League, and was supposed to join the league in the 2011–12 season. Ian Rowden's group was awarded the licence to join the A-League's 2011–12 season on 29 September 2009. However the team folded before playing one game as on 10 December 2010 the licence was formally withdrawn by the FFA.

Western Sydney (2012)

After the scrapping of Sydney Rovers FC in 2010, the FFA approached the Greater Western Sydney Football Group, who were one of the losing groups in the bid for the second expansion, in order to assess whether they would be ready to enter the competition in the 2012–13 season. The team was to be based at Stadium Australia, at Homebush and named "The Wanderers". After consultation the idea was dropped. On 4 April 2012, FFA CEO Ben Buckley announced the introduction of a "New Sydney Club" (Western Sydney Wanderers FC) for the 2012–13 season with the assistance of an $8 million federal grant. The club was initially owned by the FFA after failing to find a backer but was subsequently sold to a consortium of businessmen led by Paul Lederer in June 2014.

Western United and Macarthur FC (2019 and 2020)
In November 2016, A-League chief Greg O'Rourke gave a timetable for the possible addition of two new teams in the 2018–19 competition. Bids were explored by several clubs or consortia, including from Perth, Brisbane, Southern Sydney, Sunshine Coast, Hobart, Auckland, South East Melbourne, South Melbourne, Canberra and Wollongong. The FFA later confirmed that two clubs would be added to the league for the 2019–20 season. Initially up to 15 bids were submitted to the FFA, though by mid-2018 the league had cut that number down to 10. By the end of August 2018, the FFA had accepted bids from eight consortiums, representing the following locations; South West Sydney Macarthur (Sydney), Southern Expansion (Sydney region), Wollongong Wolves, Team 11 (South-East Melbourne), South Melbourne FC, Western Melbourne Group, Ipswich (Queensland), Canberra & Capital Region. In October 2018 this group was whittled down further to six bids, with Wollongong and Ipswich eliminated from contention.

In December 2018, the FFA announced they accepted the bid of Western United who joined the league in the 2019–20 season, playing at Kardinia Park in Geelong for their first three seasons while Wyndham City Stadium is being constructed in Tarneit. The second bid accepted was that of Macarthur FC, who joined the league in the 2020–21 season.

Canberra and Auckland (2024) 
In March 2023, the Australian Professional Leagues (who has since taken over administration and ownership of the A-League Men from Football Australia, previously known as FFA), announced that the next to expansion clubs would be based in Canberra and Auckland. This expansion will increase the number of teams to 14 from the 2024–25 season, and introduce a second New Zealand team. The APL also flagged a further two teams to be added for future seasons.

Bidding process in 2018

Brisbane City FC
Brisbane City FC was the only Brisbane-based bid for the A-League after Brisbane Strikers withdrew from the process. Their bid was not included in the final eight bid shortlist considered by the FFA in 2018.

Canberra

The original Canberra-based bid, A-League4Canberra, was announced in July 2008. It was led by TransACT CEO Ivan Slavich and gained support from many local business leaders including the manager of Canberra Stadium, where the team was expected to be based. The FFA agreed to Slavich's request to extend the deadline for bids until mid-August, and Socceroo Carl Valeri and former Socceroo Ned Zelic became foundation members.

On 10 May 2012, with the FFA announcing that A-League expansion beyond ten teams was on hold until 2015 in the wake of the establishment of a West Sydney-based side in time for the 2012–2013 season, A-League4Canberra suspended its efforts to secure a team for the Australian capital city, and the bid group was wound up. There was no connection to Capital Football owned and operated W-League club Canberra United FC.

The second Canberra A-League bid, CBR & Capital Region A-League Bid, first started fact finding operations following FFA chairman, Steven Lowey, telling the media in October 2016 that the FFA was planning on a new round of expansion for the A-League. In 2017 the FFA cooled on the idea of expansion and the Canberra bid remained dormant. In February 2018 the FFA formally announced the A-League would expand to 12 teams and opened up expressions of interests (EOI).

CBR & Capital Region A-League Bid, officially submitted its EOI and launched its bid in May 2018 along with fourteen other bids. The bid leader was revealed to be ONTHEGO Sportswear employee Michael Caggiano. The bid team revealed the new Canberra bid would be built around a community ownership model using the DFB and Bundesliga principles of 50+1, with the community owning the majority of the voting rights. The bid was shortlisted by the FFA on 29 June 2018 and progressed to the next more detailed submission phase along with nine other bids.

The Canberra and broader region bid was included in the final eight bids considered by the FFA in 2018, though it eventually lost out to Western Melbourne and South West/Macarthur. Despite this setback, the consortium has since stated they are "confident" of entering the A-League by late 2020 after discussions with the FFA, with the prospect of either joining the league as the 13th active club or perhaps replacing the New Zealand-based Wellington Phoenix FC.

On 25 August 2020, the previous Canberra bidding team announced a new proposal to obtain a licence for a Canberra based A-League team had been submitted to the FFA. The new bid was named Capital Region Football Collective (CRFC). The official proposal submitted had multi-million dollar backing from local and international sources. The proposal sought a licence to be issued with a view for a team to enter the league in the 2021/22 season. The bid team expressed their desire to secure the 13th A-League licence, however they would also be open to buying out the Central Coast Mariners’ licence if the FFA did not want to issue a new licence. Mike Charlesworth had put the Mariners licence up for sale a week earlier. The Canberra bidding team stipulated a condition of a four to six week timeframe on receiving a final answer from the FFA.

Gold Coast

In August 2017 it was announced that previous A-League club Gold Coast United FC had been reformed to represent the Gold Coast region in the Queensland National Premier League. As a part of the club's revival, chairman Danny Maher announced the club has intentions to re-enter the A-League and the W-League. Gold Coast was not included in the final eight bids considered by the FFA.

Ipswich
Expansion into the Western suburbs of Brisbane has been boosted by the growth in population projected over the coming decades. Ipswich Mayor Paul Pisasale promised in August 2013 to build a 15,000 seat stadium at North Ipswich Oval if a licence was secured. The region's bid for an A-League expansion position is further helped by the strong community ties of current NPL Queensland side Western Pride FC. The bid was included in the eight bids considered by the FFA in August 2018, though later rejected by the FFA in October 2018.

Team 11 (South East Melbourne)
A Victorian based consortium, Team 11, bid for an A-League licence, with the team aiming to represent and play in Melbourne's South East, becoming the third A-league franchise in the state. The bid was assisted by the multicultural population of 1,700,000+ people residing in the region, which includes a high soccer participation rate. The region has also been left out of most national sporting competitions, including AFL, NRL, and until 2019 the NBL which makes it hard for sporting fanatics that call the South East home to watch national league matches. The club is backed by Australian soccer icon Vince Grella, who grew up in the South East of Melbourne, as well as Socceroo, Jackson Irvine and several others. The club envisages playing out of a boutique stadium with a minimum 10,000-capacity, with the capability to expand in future.

The six biggest soccer clubs in the local government areas of the Casey and Dandenong regions united for an official A-League bid in late 2016. The region is considered one of Australia's fastest-growing in terms of population. On 30 April 2018 the bid announced an intended home stadium location, to be located next to Dandenong railway station on the site of the former stock yards. Casey Fields would be used as the club's training ground and administration base. South East Melbourne was included in the final eight bids considered by the FFA in 2018., but ultimately failed because of concerns about the consortium's ability to fund the ambitious project

South Melbourne
Former NSL powerhouse and OFC Team of the Century South Melbourne FC launch a bid to receive an expansion license for the 2018–19 A-League season. The club argued it is advantaged by possessing the required $5 million capital, as well as access to Lakeside Stadium as both a training base and home ground, and finally an ability to simultaneously launch a W-League team. South Melbourne FC was included in the final eight bids considered by the FFA in 2018.

Southern Sydney
Southern Sydney has been identified by the FFA as a possible site for future expansion. The club would likely be based between the Illawarra and Sutherland Shire and include the St George area of Southern Sydney. The area has a large number of junior soccer players but may be seen as encroaching on Sydney FC's and to a lesser extent Western Sydney Wanderers's base of supporters. By mid-2018, an additional bid had emerged, developing into a joint venture between South West Sydney and Macarthur. Both Southern Sydney and South West Sydney/Macarthur were included in the final eight bids considered by the FFA in 2018, with the latter bid winning out.

Tasmania

In October 2007, Football Federation Tasmania CEO Martin Shaw suggested that Tasmania would be a viable location for an A-League club, mentioning the fact that it would need support from state and local government. It has been suggested that such a team would play games in both Hobart and Launceston. In 2008, a Tasmanian Football Taskforce was formed to investigate an A-League bid. The Taskforce had registered the name "Tasmania United FC" and had submitted a bid for the 2011–12 season. The Taskforce chose 25 November to launch the consortium to the press and named 'Motors' as a major sponsor. A franchise in Tasmania will give the A-League a wider national representation than the AFL and NRL. A sheikh from Dubai is being linked with Tasmania's bid for an A-League team.

A Tasmania state representative team has been formed and has played pre-season friendlies such as against Melbourne Victory, indicating the possible colour scheme of a potential Tasmania club. A survey on the Tasmania United FC website found that the nickname "Wolves" was the most popular unused name amongst supporters of the consortium. Tasmania's bid was rejected by the FFA at the middle stage of the bidding process, in June 2018.

West Adelaide
Former NSL team West Adelaide SC announced an intention to enter the league as a second Adelaide team with advances made to make past Liverpool player Robbie Fowler their manager. West Adelaide was not included in the final eight bids considered by the FFA in 2018.

Wollongong

It is felt amongst most that the twice Australian champions the Wollongong Wolves FC should be the team from the Illawarra, Former Wollongong star Scott Chipperfield has thrown his support behind them and Tim Cahill has joined the group, promising to establish a soccer academy in the region. It has been rumoured the club will be backed by Bruce Gordon, Australia's 14th wealthiest person. Supporting Wollongong's bid for admission into the A-League is its strong junior participation rates in soccer, with the region widely being regarded as a 'soccer heartland' along with Western Sydney.

By 2016 the Wollongong Wolves have begun to build momentum to push for admission into the A-League. A round of 32 match of the FFA Cup against Sydney FC played on 10 August 2016 attracted a crowd in excess of 9,000 on a Wednesday night demonstrating a potential viability of the Wolves joining the A-League. Wollongong Wolves FC was included in the eight bids considered by the FFA in August 2018, though later rejected by the FFA in October 2018.

Prospective markets, and markets formerly under consideration

Auckland
In spite of the unsuccessful New Zealand Knights, New Zealand's current club, Wellington Phoenix has been relatively successful and the possibility of a second New Zealand team in the future has been raised, possibly playing home matches in Auckland or Christchurch. Previous matches in these cities have proved successful, with crowds of 15–20,000. Auckland Knights FC is the working name of an A-League expansion bid based in Auckland. In January 2013, veteran Auckland journalist Terry Maddaford and Auckland City FC President Ivan Vuksich stated expansion into Auckland remained unlikely unless lessons had been learned from the previously poor experiences of the New Zealand Knights. They commented on the need for a "hands-on" approach from investors, ones that would be close to the team, not managing from outside the country. Vuksich also commented on the fact that funding will always be an issue, that "sponsorship is almost impossible to get" and that "the New Zealand public are pretty fickle, they like to support winning teams.". This comment drew the ire of many fans of the Wellington Phoenix, which has had a constant strong following throughout its A-League career despite often achieving only middling success.

Brisbane
The former NSL club the Brisbane Strikers have expressed an interest in becoming the league's second team based in Brisbane and South East Queensland. The bid has attracted high-profile backers such as former A-League manager Miron Bleiberg. This would create a Brisbane Derby against the Brisbane Roar.

Cairns
On 8 March 2014 it was announced that the National Premier Leagues outfit from Cairns, the Far North Queensland Heat had signed a sponsorship deal with the Aquis project to help them achieve a NYL team and an A-League licence. This came just days after it was announced that the Fung family had launched a $269 million takeover bid of the Reef Hotel Casino in the Cairns CBD and that their Aquis project worth $4.2 billion was to develop a mega-resort including a casino, nine hotels, theatres, a golf course, and a 25,000 seat stadium at the Yorkeys Knob site.

Darwin
There is currently no Northern Territory-based team competing in any national competition other than the FFA cup. In 2008 after successful A-League pre-season games were played in Darwin, the NT Government offered its support for a Darwin-based A-League bid.

Geelong
With a strong soccer community in the area, the addition of another Victorian team into the A-League for Geelong has been long supported by key figures and locals alike in the Geelong region.

In March 2008, mounting speculation suggested that a Geelong-based syndicate was working on a proposal for an A-League licence in the competition's next expansion period. Federal Labor MP Darren Cheeseman became one of the main advocates of a Geelong-based side going as far as launching a $20,000 feasibility study to find a location, design, and cost for a new regional soccer facility in the city. The City of Geelong said it was prepared to make Kardinia Park available for soccer with Geelong Football Club CEO Brian Cook saying a ground-sharing situation would work between the two codes. John Mitchell pointed to Newcastle Jets' grand final success in the third season of the A-League, saying Geelong had the capabilities to match its northern counterparts.
 
A Consortium has met with the FFA since the middle of 2016 to discuss receiving an A-League franchise. Meetings are taking place between Geelong Council, The Victorian State Government and the Kardinia Park Trust. In early 2017 the consortium announced it would be entering the race for expansion spots under the working title of Victoria Patriots. Former Socceroo Steve Horvat the spokesperson.

Gold Coast

In November 2015 Gold Coast City FC was formed to represent the Gold Coast region in the Queensland National Premier League. As a part of the club's creation, general manager Ben Mannion announced the club has intentions to enter the A-League as the second Gold Coast A-League franchise following the failure of the Gold Coast United FC.

Perth
Football West, the state governing body for soccer in Western Australia, have expressed interest in securing a second A-League team in Perth, with Football West chairman Liam Twigger believing that a second Perth-based side would boost soccer's footprint in WA, increase interest in the A-League and would help double the number of opportunities for players, officials, coaches and fans to engage in the game. Twigger stated that the potential side would go by the working title of the Black Swans – the nickname of the Western Australian State Team that is composed to play an annual friendly against current A-League side, Perth Glory. A second A-League franchise in Perth is believed to have to have the capacity to attract considerable support considering the popularity of the sport in Western Australia's capital, as well as many fans' disenfranchisement following recent administration scandals surrounding the Glory.

South East Asia
A detailed plan was revealed to have been rejected by former FFA chairman Frank Lowy which would have seen the A-League expand to a 16–20 team league administered in Australia with the additional teams based in South East Asia.

Sunshine Coast
Sunshine Coast F.C., who currently play in the Queensland State League, have expressed interest in joining the A-League, indicating a five-year plan in late 2012. The club currently plays at Stockland Park, though the stadium would need expansion to meet A-League standards. Sunshine Coast F.C. Director Noel Woodall has noted that there are already plans in place to turn the ground into a premier boutique stadium, with an undercover seating capacity of 10 000 and a total capacity of 15 000 or more. He says that it is part of the club's long-term strategy to join the A-League.

Sydney Rovers (2011)

In 2009, a 12th licence was awarded to Sydney Rovers. The club soon became defunct afterwards and the FFA withdrew the license and gave it instead to Western Sydney Wanderers FC.

Townsville
North Queensland Fury was renamed Northern Fury in 2012 and reformed to compete in the NPL Queensland. So far Fury home matches have drawn capacity crowds of up to 2500 at Townsville Sports Reserve, and the club plans a return to the A-League within five years, with a National Youth League team to be established prior to that. The Fury have been active advocating the FFA for creating a framework for expansion.

See also

Expansion of the National Rugby League
Proposed VFL/AFL clubs

References

A-League Men